John Stokes (12 May 1872 – 17 September 1942) was a British trade unionist and political activist.

Stokes came to prominence as secretary of the small London Glass Bottle Makers union.  He was also a member of the British Socialist Party (BSP), who put him forward as their proposed candidate for Bradford East at the election which was expected to take place in 1914 or 1915.  However, this was against the wishes of local BSP activists, and he failed to gain the support of the local Independent Labour Party.

Long active on the London Trades Council, Stokes replaced his BSP comrade Fred Knee as its secretary in 1914, serving for three years.  Also in 1914, the BSP affiliated to the Labour Party, and Stokes immediately took a leading role in founding the London Labour Party, serving as its first Chairman.

Although Stokes strongly opposed conscription during World War I, he did not oppose the war overall.  This placed him on the right-wing of the BSP, and in 1916 he joined several other leading figures in splitting away to form the National Socialist Party (NSP).

Stokes remained secretary of his union, while also becoming chair of the National Federation of Glass Workers and Kindred Trade Unions.

References

1872 births
1942 deaths
British Socialist Party members
English trade unionists